Margrove Park is a village in the borough of Redcar and Cleveland and the ceremonial county of North Yorkshire, England.

References

External links

Villages in North Yorkshire
Places in the Tees Valley
Redcar and Cleveland